Larry Marks (born April 13, 1972) is an American former professional boxer who competed from 1996 to 2009. He challenged for the WBA welterweight title against Andrew Lewis in 2001.

He was born in Selma, Alabama and currently lives in New Castle, Delaware.

References

External links
 

1972 births
Living people
Boxers from Alabama
Sportspeople from Selma, Alabama
American male boxers
People from New Castle, Delaware
Super-middleweight boxers